Admiral Sir Charles Talbot  KCB (1 November 1801 – 8 August 1876) was a Royal Navy officer who went on to be Commander-in-Chief, The Nore.

Naval career
Talbot was the second son of the Rev. Charles Talbot, and Lady Elizabeth Somerset, daughter of Henry Somerset, 5th Duke of Beaufort. He joined the Royal Navy as a cadet in 1815. Promoted to Captain in 1830, he commanded HMS Warspite, HMS Vestal, HMS Maeander and then HMS Algiers. He was appointed Commander-in-chief, Queenstown in 1858 and Commander-in-Chief, The Nore in 1864.

He presented a stained glass window to All Saints Church, Down Ampney, Gloucestershire in appreciation after his ship survived a storm off Sebastopol in 1854.

There is a memorial window to him and his wife in the church of St. John the Baptist in Biggleswade.

Family
In 1838 he married Hon. Charlotte Georgiana Ponsonby; they had three sons and four daughters.

See also

References

|-

1801 births
1876 deaths
Royal Navy admirals
Knights Commander of the Order of the Bath